Javanshir Izzat oglu Rahimov (June 5, 1973 – August 6, 1992) was an Azerbaijani soldier and the National Hero of Azerbaijan.

Early years
Rahimov was born in Qaşqaçay, Qakh. When he was one year old his family moved to Baku , Qaraçuxur. He finished secondary school No. 104 in Suraxanı raion.

Military service
In April 1992, Javanshir Rahimov entered active military service. He became an onboard shooter on Military helicopters. He expressed his desire to go to war as a volunteer and was assigned to a MI-24 Helicopter.

Nagorno Karabakh War 
On August 6, 1992, on his second flight of the day he was wounded. Rahimov insisted that he was ready for flight and flew again. This time their helicopter was shot down by missile fire from Armenian forces.

He was posthumously awarded the title of the National Hero of Azerbaijan on 14 September 1992, by the decree № 204 of the President of Azerbaijan Republic.

See also

 First Nagorno-Karabakh War
 List of National Heroes of Azerbaijan

References

Sources 
Vugar Asgarov. Azərbaycanın Milli Qəhrəmanları (Yenidən işlənmiş II nəşr). Bakı: "Dərələyəz-M", 2010, səh. 241.

1973 births
1992 deaths
National Heroes of Azerbaijan
People from Qakh District
Azerbaijani military personnel
Azerbaijani military personnel killed in action